Broken Safety is the debut album by American rapper 40 Cal. from Harlem, New York. It was released on August 8, 2006 via Diplomat Records, Asylum Records and Atlantic Records, and features guest appearances from Akon, Bezel, Freekey Zekey, J.R. Writer, A-Mafia, Young Ace, Rod Man and Su Da Boss.

Track listing

Chart history

References

External links
40 Cal – Broken Safety at Discogs

2006 debut albums
40 Cal. albums
Albums produced by Kwamé
Albums produced by Dame Grease
Albums produced by the Heatmakerz
Diplomat Records albums